Paul Lyngdoh is an Indian politician and poet who was born in Shillong, Meghalaya, in 1972. As of 2014 he is the working president of the United Democratic Party and a member of the Legislative Assembly of Meghalaya. 
He contested the Shillong Lok Sabha seat in the 2009 Indian general election as the UDP candidate. 

His wife Sweety Pala was the lead actor in the 2016 National Award winning Khasi language movie Onaatah.

References

Living people
People from Shillong
Candidates in the 2014 Indian general election
Meghalaya politicians
United Democratic Party (Meghalaya) politicians
Meghalaya MLAs 2013–2018
Year of birth missing (living people)